Wheelchair fencing at the 1972 Summer Paralympics consisted of eleven events, eight for men and three for women.

Medal summary

References 

 

1972 Summer Paralympics events
1972
Paralympics
International fencing competitions hosted by Germany